Komsomolsk are a Russian indie rock band formed in Moscow in 2017. The group has released over 50 songs, two studio albums and five extended play records.

History 
Komsomlsk's origins began in late 2015 when Daria (Dasha) Deriugina, Ivan Riabov, and Arina Andreeva met in Moscow before the band's first rehearsals. Several months later Deriugina suggested they form a Russian-speaking group, and the others agreed. Riabov is credited with coming up with the band's name, inspired by a cover of satirical magazine Krokodil from 1967. A bit later Ilia Lopatin joined them as a drummer, completing the band's original line-up.

2017–2019: First steps and EP era 

Komsomolsk delivered a debut EP Komsomolsk-1 in June 2017 and went live two weeks later on a joint gig with the group Liubov i Roboty. From the very first show, the girls' colorful wigs appear the core feature of the band's stage image. One of the reasons for the wigs introduction was Dasha's intention to distinguish her two then-projects, Russian-speaking Komsomolsk and Anglicized Gin&Milk. 

Right after debut live performance, Ilia Lopatin quit the band and emigrated to Poland, being immediately replaced with Pavel Kochetov, a drummer from Voronezh. Together with Pavel, the band signed to the independent recording label Peter Explorer and released another two extended records, Kassa Svobody and 90210 until the end of 2017.

In spring 2018, the band followed up with the fourth official release, six-track EP Dorogie Moskvichi. The one appeared a major breakthrough followed by band's first music video Gde My Seichas?, solo gigs sold-outs in Moscow, a number of festival appearances including iconic Afisha Picnic, and live performance at Evening Urgant TV talk show aired on Channel One. Together with Yandex.Music, the band released their second music video Orkestr as well as a song My Ishchem Cheloveka written in collaboration with Yandex neural network. In the fall, the group left on band's first tour of twelve Russian cities.

The band released their fifth EP, Den Psikha in June 2019. The new record was presented on the Worker and Kolkhoz Woman Pavilion rooftop – in spite of heavy rain, the gig was played until the end. The only music video for this release, Chernyi Kvadrat debuted in December 2019.

2020–2021: LP era 

On 21 August 2020, the band quite unexpectedly released their first studio album Blizhnii Svet consisting of nine tracks. As the musicians said, this record is 'a sort of impressionism, a canvas depicting an everyday evening in Moscow, although you would hardly distinguish anything – only lights from cars, street lamps, and windows'. This record joined the list of the best Russian albums in 2020 published by online newspapers Meduza and Ridus.

The second studio album Retro was delivered just within a year in May 2021 and was hailed by critics as a sequel of Blizhnii Svet, yet recorded in Baroque pop aesthetics. Dasha Deriugina claimed this release to be 'the fastest album we have ever recorded, the band's most conceptual statement, fresh and pure like the green foliage in May'. The album's major hit, Glaza (Prilipli) was performed live at the Evening Urgant show and later hit Chartova Diuzhina music chart to stay at number one for a week and remain in Top 5 for nine weeks in total.

Band members 

 Daria Deriugina — vocals, lead guitar
 Arina Andreeva — vocals, keyboards
 Ivan Ryabov — bass guitar, baritone guitar
 Pavel Kochetov — drums

Timeline

Discography

Studio albums

Extended records

Singles

Music videos

References

Russian indie rock groups
Musical groups from Moscow
Russian musical groups
Musical groups established in 2017